Tirana Times is a weekly newspaper published in English and is headquartered in Tirana, Albania.

History and profile
Tirana Times is the first weekly English newspaper in Albania. The paper was established in 2005. The weekly provides news on politics, business and economy, opinion, features, sports, arts and culture with a special focus on Albania and the Balkans. It has an independent political leaning, and is published in partnership with the Albanian Institute for International Studies, Albania's top think tank. As of 2015 Jerina Zaloshnja was the editor in chief. Andi Balla served as the executive editor of the weekly. 

The paper launched a website in 2006 which is updated daily which was the 12th most visited news portal in Albania in 2013.

See also
 List of newspapers in Albania

References

External links

2005 establishments in Albania
English-language newspapers published in Europe
Mass media in Tirana
Newspapers published in Albania
Newspapers established in 2005
Weekly newspapers